Baschet Club Athletic Constanța, commonly known as Athletic Constanța or simply Athletic, is a Romanian basketball club based in Constanța, currently participates in the Liga Națională, the top-tier league in Romania.

The club initially played in the second-tier Liga I. However, in 2018 the league was merged with the top-tier Liga Națională. Also, Baschet Club Athletic Constanța has youth groups involved within the National Championship, U16 Men CSS1-Athletic coached by George Mircioi, BC Athletic U13 & U14 Men and Women coached by Bogdan Ivanovici & Alina Șerban and Athletic-Laguna Women coached by Aurelia Lazăr and Alina Șerban.

Current roster

References

External links

2007 establishments in Romania
Sport in Constanța
Basketball teams in Romania
Basketball teams established in 2007